Clara Friedman (born 13 April 1920, died 14 October 2015), née Klara Hodosi, was an Israeli chess player who held the title of Woman International Master (WIM, 1966). She was a three-time winner of the Israel Women's Chess Championship (1961, 1963, 1965).

Biography
Born in Romania, she lived in Israel from 1961. In the 1960s Clara Friedman was one of the leading Israeli woman chess players. She won the Israel Women's Chess Championship three times, in 1961, 1963, and 1965. In 1966, she was awarded the FIDE Woman International Master (WIM) title. In 1967, Clara Friedman participated in the Women's World Chess Championship Candidates Tournament in Subotica, Serbia and finished in 17th place.

References

Literature
 Игорь Бердичевский. Шахматная еврейская энциклопедия. Москва: Русский шахматный дом, 2016 (Igor Berdichevsky. The Chess Jewish Encyclopedia. Moscow: Russian Chess House, 2016, p. 270) 

1920 births
2015 deaths
Sportspeople from Oradea
Israeli female chess players
Jewish chess players
Chess Woman International Masters
Romanian emigrants to Israel